Foindle  is a village on the south shore of Loch Laxford in Lairg, Sutherland, Scottish Highlands and is in the Scottish council area of Highland.

The village of Fanagmore is located 0.5 miles to the west, and sit in the same cove.

References

Populated places in Sutherland